Frederick Samuel Ashley-Cooper (born c. 22 March 1877 in Bermondsey, London; died 31 January 1932 in Milford, near Godalming, Surrey) was a cricket historian and statistician.

According to Wisden, Ashley-Cooper wrote "103 books and pamphlets on the game ... besides a very large amount of matter including 40,000 biographical or obituary notices". For more than thirty years he was responsible for "Births and Deaths" and "Cricket Records" in Wisden; between 1887 and 1932 the Records section of the Almanack had grown from two pages to sixty-one pages. Frail and short-sighted, he never played cricket, and seldom watched, but his "total involvement in the game almost precluded every other interest".

Books
His most notable works were:
 Cricket Magazine (1900) reproducing notices of known matches played 1742 to 1751
 Sussex Cricket and Cricketers (1901)
 Curiosities of First-Class Cricket 1730-1901 (1901)
 Nottinghamshire Cricket and Cricketers (1923)
 The Hambledon Cricket Chronicle 1772-1796 (1924)
 Cricket Highways and Byways (1927) (essays)
 Kent Cricket Matches 1719-1880 (1929)

See also
 Variations in first-class cricket statistics

References

Further reading
 Wynne-Thomas, P., F S Ashley-Cooper - A Biographical Sketch & Bibliography, Association of Cricket Statisticians and Historians, 2003

Cricket historians and writers
1877 births
1932 deaths
Cricket statisticians